Valery Bondyk is a People's Deputy of Ukraine, member of Party of Regions fraction (since November 2007), Chairman of the Committee on the Judiciary (since December 2007), member of the High Council of Justice (since March 2007).

Biography

Valery Bondyk was born on 1 April 1964 in Dobropillya, Donetsk Oblast', his father was a miner. 
In 1985 Valery Bondik graduated from Donetsk Higher Military-Political School of Engineering and Signal Corps.
In 1996 he graduated the National Law Academy of Ukraine named after Yaroslav the Wise, majoring in case law
In 2010 Valery Bondyk defended his Ph.D. thesis in Odessa Law Academy and hold the degree of Candidate of legal sciences.

Career

 1985-1986 - Deputy company commander for political affairs, the military unit in Turkmenistan
 1986-1990 - Deputy company commander for political affairs, military unit in Hungary
 1990-1991 - work in ideological department of Donetsk city committee of the Communist Party of Ukraine
 1991-1992 - legal advisor at Donetsk railway management; legal advisor, Donetsk broker firm "Variant"
 1992-1994 - lawyer, Executive Director, deputy Director General of the law firm "INYUR"(Donetsk)
 1994-1995 - lawyer at the Kalinin district office of State Tax Inspectorate (Donetsk)
 1995-1996 - trainee prosecutor of the Donetsk Oblast' Prosecutor's Office, at that time he passed the qualifying exam for lawyers' testimony
 1996-1998 - Head of the legal department of Donetsk Chocolate Factory "AVK"
 1998-2004 - lawyer, arbitration manager, Head of the scientific and methodological center for crisis management(Donetsk). Since 1999 - part-time lecturer at Donetsk State Academy of Management.
 January 2004 to December 2004 - Member of the Central Election Commission (under the leadership of Serhii Kivalov )
 2004-2006 - assistant to the People's Deputy of Ukraine
 2006-2007 - People's Deputy of Ukraine from the Party of Regions in the 5th Verkhovna Rada (No. 101 in the electoral list), Chairman of the subcommittee of the Judiciary Committee
 since February 2007 to November 2007 - First Deputy Minister of Justice of Ukraine (Oleksandr Lavrynovych)

At the parliamentary elections in 2007 Valery Bondyk went to Parliament again from the Party of Regions (No. 130 in the list). In Verkhovna Rada he takes the position of Deputy Chairman of the Justice Committee

Social activities

Valery Bondyk has been the member of Donetsk Oblast' council(since 1998 to 2004), member of the qualification commission of judges in Donetsk oblast' (since 1998 to 2004), member of the Supreme Council of Justice (since March 2007).

Family

Valery Bondyk is married, his wife Irina (born 1969) is a dentist. They have one daughter, Alexandra (born 1990).

Awards

Medals:
 1987 - "70 years of USSR Armed Forces"
 2006 - "15 years in the Armed Forces of Ukraine"
 2007 - "15 years of military intelligence of Ukraine"

In 2009 he hold the title "Honored Lawyer of Ukraine" by Presidential Decree, for personal contribution to the law development, professionalism in protecting constitutional rights and freedoms.
In 2010 Valery Bondyk was awarded as "Lawyer of the Year" within the national program "Man of the Year 2010".

References

External links 
 Valery Bondyk profile at the official Verkhovna Rada web portal
 Valery Bondyk personal website

See also 
2007 Ukrainian parliamentary election
List of Ukrainian Parliament Members 2007
Party of Regions

Living people
1964 births
Party of Regions politicians
Fifth convocation members of the Verkhovna Rada
Sixth convocation members of the Verkhovna Rada
People from Dobropillya